The 2017 Men's African Hockey Indoor Cup of Nations was held in Swakopmund, Namibia from 23–25 June 2017. The competition featured three teams, an increase from 2013 as Zimbabwe featured for the first time ever. South Africa defeated Namibia in the final and secured a place in the 2018 Men's Indoor Hockey World Cup.

Participating nations 
Three countries participated in this years tournament:

Umpires 
 Lee Barron (England)
 Peter Caulder (South Africa)
 Sedric Makati (Namibia)
 Munashe Mashoko (Zimbabwe)
 Gary Simmonds - Umpire Manager (South Africa)

Squads

South Africa 
Head coach: Pierre le Roux

Namibia 
Head coach: Trevor Cormack

Zimbabwe 
Head Coach: Edward Chiringah

Results 
All times are in West Africa Time (UTC+02:00).

Round robin

Final

Final standings

Awards
The following awards were given at the conclusion of the tournament.

Statistics

Goal Scorers

Cards

References 

Africa Cup
field hockey
field hockey
field hockey
2017